Capitão Brasil do UniversoX1 de Maurício Dos Santos #SissolterX1 is a comic series depicting the adventures of the character Capitão Brasil, published in Brazil beginning in 2004. The character is a typical Brazilian malandro. The Capitão lives in Rio de Janeiro, his stories typically occurring in a region close to Copacabana beach. Capitão Brasil is an obvious parody, and for some a critic, of Captain America.

Character
Although he is said to be a superhero, Capitão Brasil has neither developed muscles nor powerful fists. He wears a hero-like suit that is yellow, with a green detail on the underwear, like Superman and other known comic book heroes. These colors are an allusion to the Brazilian flag, just like the red and blue suits of American superheroes. Like the "S" on Superman's suit, on the chest of Capitão's suit there appears a large "CB" logo that stands for Capitão Brasil. The logo is stylized like a shield with 27 stars meant to represent the Brazilian states. In his arms, he holds two cardboard pictures: an image of Cristo Redentor, on his left, and of Pão de Açucar, on his right.

References 

Brazilian webcomics